Garry Fabian Miller HonFRPS (born 1957) is a British photographic artist. Since the 1980s, he has specialised in camera-less photography. His work was exhibited at the Victoria & Albert Museum in London in 2005, and at the Rencontres d'Arles in the same year. He was made an honorary fellow of the Royal Photographic Society in 2017.

References

External links 
 Garry Fabian Miller, The Night Cell, Winter 2009/2010 Water, light, Lightjet c-print from dye destruction print The Telegraph. Retrieved June 2011

1957 births
Living people
Photographers from Bristol